In the Orthodox Church in America (OCA), the diocese is the basic church body that comprises all the parishes of a determined geographical area. It is governed by the Diocesan Bishop, with the assistance of a Diocesan Assembly and a Diocesan Council. The OCA is currently composed of twelve geographic and three ethnic dioceses. The boundaries of the ethnic dioceses overlap those of certain geographic ones. These dioceses are the result of smaller ethnic jurisdictions joining the OCA at some point in its history, usually after having broken from other bodies.

The Stavropegial Institutions are churches, monastic communities, and theological schools that are under the jurisdiction of the OCA's primate, Metropolitan Tikhon (Mollard).

Sources
OCA listing of dioceses
Orthodox Church in America on OrthodoxWiki

 
America
Dioceses of OCA